Reservoir 3 is a man-made reservoir located in the northern portion of the city of New Rochelle along the New Rochelle - Eastchester boundary in Westchester County, New York. Constructed in 1908, the reservoir is impounded by the New Rochelle "Reservoir 3 dam" on the Hutchinson River. The reservoir is currently owned by the Westchester County Department of Parks and Recreation.

This reservoir serves as a storage reservoir for the high-level system, with the overflow from it passing directly to Reservoir 2. The water from this reservoir, and from Reservoir 2, was originally pumped at a pumping station into the mains of the high service system to serve the northern portions of New Rochelle.

The upper end of the reservoir is swampy at the point where the Hutchinson River enters. Just above the upper end of the reservoir and on the east side there is a small feeder which flows into the main river and has its headwaters near the parkway  to the east of the main river.

References

External links
 

Reservoirs in Westchester County, New York
Reservoirs in New York (state)
Geography of New Rochelle, New York